The Derby Catacombs (also referred to as the Guildhall Catacombs) are a series of tunnels running beneath the city of Derby, most notably beneath the Marketplace and Derby Guildhall. Access to the tunnels is available via a back room of the nearby Tiger pub.

During the Victorian era, the tunnels were used to ferry prisoners between the police station at "Lock-Up Yard" and the Courts of Assizes, held at the Guildhall.

References

Tunnels in Derbyshire
Geography of Derby